The 2022 GT & Prototype Challenge powered by Hankook was the sixth season of the GT & Prototype Challenge. It began at Hockenheimring 14 May and ended at TT Circuit Assen on 30 October.

Calendar

Entry list

Race results
Bold indicates overall winner.

Championship standings

References

External links

GT & Prototype Challenge
GT & Prototype Challenge
GT & Prototype Challenge